Stine Johansen is a Norwegian sport wrestler.

She won a bronze medal at the 1987 World Wrestling Championships in Lørenskog.

References

Year of birth missing (living people)
Living people
Norwegian female sport wrestlers
World Wrestling Championships medalists
20th-century Norwegian women